The Păiș is a right tributary of the river Jijioara in Romania. It flows into the Jijioara in Focuri.

References

Rivers of Romania
Rivers of Iași County